Hoggett is a surname. Notable people with the surname include:

 Steven Hoggett (born 1971), British choreographer 
 Roger Hoggett (1942–2019), Australian rules footballer

See also
 Hogget (disambiguation)
 Hoggart
 Hogsett